Santa Maria a Scò is a romanesque-style, Roman Catholic parish church located on the strada dei Sette Ponti, in the town of Castelfranco Piandiscò, in the Valdarno of the region of Tuscany, Italy.

History
This pieve church was first documented in 1008, when it was placed under the control of the Abbey of Santa Trinita in Alpe. Documents show that the church was by 1259 offered baptisms.

The exterior is plain. The interior has columns with sculpted capitals. The church contains a fresco depicting an Enthroned Madonna with Child Blessing attributed to 
Paolo Schiavo. The main altar now contains bas-reliefs with Life of Mary (2008) by Mauro Capitani. Frescoes near the entrance are attributed to Luberto da Montevarchi.

References

11th-century Roman Catholic church buildings in Italy
Romanesque architecture in Tuscany
Churches in the province of Arezzo